Postplatyptilia parana is a moth of the family Pterophoridae. It is known from Argentina, Brazil and Costa Rica.

The wingspan is about 20 mm.

References

parana
Moths described in 1996